José Belarmino Jaime is the President of El Salvador's Supreme Court. He was elected by the national legislative assembly in 2009.

References

Living people
Salvadoran judges
Year of birth missing (living people)
Place of birth missing (living people)